Maria-Elisabeth Schaeffler (born 17 August 1941) is a German businesswoman and one of the owners of Schaeffler Group, one of and the world's largest producers of rolling bearings. The other owner is her son Georg F. W. Schaeffler.

Early life
Schaeffler was born in Prague in 1941, which was then in the Protectorate of Bohemia and Moravia, and grew up in Vienna, Austria.

Career
In 1963, Schaeffler married Georg Schaeffler, and moved to Herzogenaurach in Franconia, which is located within Bavaria. It was through Schaeffler's marriage that she would come to work for Schaeffler Group AG. In 1996 Georg died, and she took the reins of the family business.

It has been Schaeffler's legacy to continue with her husband's life's work, growing the family business, Schaeffler Group AG. Since 1996 Schaeffler has led her company through multiple lucrative acquisitions, including: INA, LUK, and FAG. These three companies in particular are large brand name corporations in making rolling bearings. These three acquisitions have made Schaeffler Group AG one of the largest producers of rolling bearings and linear motion products in the World.

In 1999, Schaeffler led the acquisition of the remaining shares of LuK, a clutch manufacturer, obtaining 50% of the shares of the company for Schaeffler Group AG. Schaeffler Group already owned 50% of the LuK shares. In 2001 she led the acquisition of FAG Kugelfischer Georg Schäfer AG Schweinfurt, with the acquisitions of FAG and INA, Schaeffler Group AG had become the second largest producer of rolling bearings in the World. In 2009 Schaeffler Group purchased a significant share of the company Continental AG.

Since 1996, Schaeffler Group AG has seen an increase in annual turnover and employment. By 2013 the annual turnover reached approximately 10 billion euros, and the employment tripled to over 70,000 employees, an impressive mark for a completely privately owned company.

Political activities
Schaeffler served as a CSU delegate to the Federal Convention for the purpose of electing the President of Germany in 2004. During the Hannover Messe in April 2016, she was among the 15 German corporate leaders who were invited to a private dinner with President Barack Obama.

Other activities

Corporate boards
 Deloitte Germany, Member of the Advisory Board (2009-2018)
 Austrian State and Industrial Holding (ÖIAG), Member of the Supervisory Board (2008-2014)
 Deutsche Bank, Member of the European Advisory Board (2005-2014)
 BayernLB, Member of the Supervisory Board (-2014)
 Nürnberger Lebensversicherung AG, Member of the Supervisory Board (2012-2013)

Non-profit organizations
 Deutsches Museum, Member of the Board of Trustees
 Mozarteum University of Salzburg, Member of the Advisory Board
 Salzburg Easter Festival, Member of the Board of Trustees
 Konzertgesellschaft München, Member of the Board of Trustees (2002-2018)

Recognition
Schaeffler has been given many awards and accolades, including the following:
 2001 – Cross of Merit with Ribbon of the Order of Merit of the Federal Republic of Germany 
 2001 – Medal of Honor by the Nuremberg Chamber of Commerce for the Mid-Franconian region
 2002 – Honorary citizen of the town of Höchstadt/Aisch
 2003 – Bavarian Order of Merit
 2004 – "Family Entrepreneur of the Year" award, presented by the economics magazine "impulse" and the "INTES Akademie für Familienunternehmen" (INTES Academy for Family-Owned Companies)
 2005 – Honorary Member of the Senate of the Transylvania University of Brasov, Romania
 2005 – Honorary citizen of the town of Jeonju, Jeollabuk-Do province, Korea 
 2006 – Honorary citizen of the town of Herzogenaurach Entry in the "Golden Book" of the Erlangen-Höchstadt district
 2007 – Large Silver Medal with Star for Services to the Republic of Austria 
 2007 – 1st Class Cross of Merit of the Order of Merit of the Federal Republic of Germany 
 2007 – Karmarsch Medal
 2011 – "Großer Tiroler Adler" medal 
 2011 – "Personality of the Year" award presented by the ÖkoGlobe-Institut of Duisburg-Essen University
 2012 – "Gold medal of the District" for the Erlangen-Höchstadt district
 2013 – "Family Entrepreneur of the Year award, 2012", selected by a jury of representatives of German industry and Handelsblatt

References

Bibliography
Press Releases: Maria-Elisabeth Schaeffler receives the Karmarsch Medal from the Association of Friends of Hanover University; Schaeffler AG; 3 December 2007
Press Releases: Maria-Elisabeth Schaeffler is awarded the Cross of Merit, 1st Class of the Order of Merit of the Federal Republic of Germany for special services to the nation; Schaeffler AG; 5 October 2007
 AND SOCIAL COMMITMENT OF THE BUSINESSWOMAN FROM HERZOGENAURACH Maria-Elisabeth Schaeffler Receives German Verdienstkreuz; Schaeffler AG; 3 May 2001

External links
Forbes World's Richest People

Female billionaires
Businesspeople from Bavaria
German billionaires
Living people
1941 births
Officers Crosses of the Order of Merit of the Federal Republic of Germany
20th-century German businesswomen
20th-century German businesspeople
Businesspeople from Prague
People from Erlangen-Höchstadt
21st-century German businesswomen
21st-century German businesspeople